The A8 autoroute, also known as La Provençale, is a -long highway in France that runs between Aix-en-Provence and the A7 to the Côte d'Azur.

Route 

The A8 is an extension of the A7 starting to the west of Aix-en-Provence at La Fare-les-Oliviers. The road passes through the Departments of Bouches-du-Rhône, Var and Alpes-Maritimes.  It serves the towns of Aix-en-Provence, Fréjus, Saint-Raphaël, Mandelieu-la-Napoule, Cannes, Antibes, Nice, Monaco and Menton before crossing the border where it becomes the A10 in Italy. It crosses the mountain ranges of Sainte-Baume and of Maures between Aix-en-Provence and Fréjus and the Massif de l'Esterel between Saint-Raphaël and Cannes. Following the Grande Corniche the road offers panoramas of the sea between Nice and Menton.

Capacity 

 2x3 lanes from Coudoux (the junction with the A7 to La Barque (junction with the A52).
 2x2 lanes from La Barque to Saint-Maximin-la-Sainte-Baume (being expanded to 2x3 lanes) increases to 2x3 lanes at Cagnes-sur-Mer.
 2x4 lanes from Cagnes-sur-Mer to Saint-Laurent-du-Var (the road enters the Nice conurbation).
 2x2 lanes in the section through the southern Alps from Nice Saint-Augustin to the frontier with Italy, this section has 15 tunnels. There is a speed limit of 90 km/h in the tunnels (70 km/h for large vehicles).

Traffic 

The road has heavy traffic all year round and is especially congested in July and August (in particular around Antibes and Nice. As a result, traffic-management schemes have been adopted between Var to Nice-West similar to those on the Péripherique in Paris. The autoroute is regularly closed on the Nice-Menton section as a result of rock falls onto the carriageways. The sections crossing the Maures and L'Esterel mountains are at risk from forest fires in summer.

Interchanges 

 28 : A7 autoroute, Coudoux
  Aires de repos:  Ventabren
 29 18 km: Aix-en-Provence (ouest)
 28 : A51 autoroute
 30 19 km: Aix-en-Provence (pont de l'Arc)
 31 21 km: Aix-en-Provence (est)
 32 27 km: N7 Châteauneuf-le-Rouge
  Péage de La Barque
  : A52 autoroute
  Aires de service: Rousset (eastbound) L'Arc (westbound)
 33 47 km: Pourrières
  Aires de repos:  Saint-Hilaire (eastbound) Barcelone (westbound)
 34 58 km: Saint-Maximin-la-Sainte-Baume
  Aires de service: Cambarette
 35 74 km: Brignoles
 Aires de repos: Roudai/Candumy
  : A57 autoroute
  Aires de service: Vidauban
 36 118 km: Draguignan / Le Muy, Gulf of Saint-Tropez
  Aires de repos:  Jas Pellicot
  Aires de service:  Canaver
 37 129 km: Fréjus / Puget-sur-Argens
  Péage de Le Capitou/Fréjus Ouest
 38 134 km: Fréjus / Saint-Raphaël
  Aires de service:  L'Esterel
 39 145 km: les Adrets-de-l'Esterel
 40 157 km: Mandelieu-la-Napoule
 41 159 km: Cannes / Les Tourrades
 42 165 km: Cannes / Mougins
 Aires de repos:  Piccolaret
  Aires de service:  Breguieres
 44 171 km: Antibes Ouest, Sophia Antipolis
  Péage d' Antibes Ouest
 46 178 km: Villeneuve-Loubet / Bouches du Loup
 47 179 km: Villeneuve-Loubet Centre
 48 181 km: Cagnes-sur-Mer
 49 185 km: Saint-Laurent-du-Var
 50 186 km: Nice (promenade des Anglais)
 51 187 km: Nice (Saint-Augustin)
  Péage de Nice Saint-Isidore
 52 190 km: Nice (Saint-Isidore)
 54 197 km: Nice (nord)
 55 199.5 km: Nice (l'Ariane)
 56 :  Monaco (A500 Spur)
  Péage de La Turbie
 57 208 km: La Turbie
  Aires de service:  La Scoperta (eastbound) Beausoleil (westbound)
 58 214 km: Roquebrune-Cap-Martin
 59 220 km: Menton
 State border
 224 km  Autostrada A10 (Italy)

Opening dates of the A8

1956: Creation of Escota, a company to be in charge of all the sections from Aix-en-Provence to the Italian Frontier.
1961: Opening of the toll sections of Fréjus through Mandelieu-la-Napoule to Cagnes-sur-Mer (exit 46).
1969: Opening of the toll section from Roquebrune to the Italian frontier (initially only one carriageway and for lightweight vehicles. Then, in 1970, both carriageways were opened).
1971–1974: Staged opening of the sections between Aix-en-Provence and Fréjus.
1976: Opening of the section between Cagnes-sur-Mer and Roquebrune (partly one carriageway only—the doubling of some tunnels was completed as late as 1988).

External links

Autoroute A8 on Saratlas

A08